Kandla, now officially Deendayal Port Authority, is a seaport and town in Kutch district of Gujarat state in Western India, near the city of Gandhidham. Located on the Gulf of Kutch, it is one of India's major ports on the west coast. It is about 256 nautical miles southeast of the Port of Karachi in Pakistan and about 430 nautical miles north-northwest of the Port of Mumbai. Kandla Port was constructed in the 1950s as the chief seaport serving western India.

It is the largest port of India by volume of cargo handled. The west coast port handled 7,223 crore (72,225 million) tonnes of cargo in 2008-09, over 11% more than the 6,492 crore (64,920 million) tonnes handled in 2007-08. Even as much of this growth has come from handling of crude oil imports, mainly for Nayara Energy's Vadinar refinery in Gujarat, the port is also taking measures to boost non-POL cargo. Last fiscal, POL traffic accounted for 63 per cent of the total cargo handled at Kandla Port, as against 59% in 2007-08. In 2015-16 the port handled 10.6 crore (106 million) tonnes of cargo.

Kandla Port was renamed as Deendayal Port in 2017 under the Indian Ports Act, 1908.

Traffic handled
In 2008-09, total port traffic grew by 13.6% to reach an all-time high of 7,223 crore (72,225 million) tonnes. The port's share in traffic handled by all major ports has risen steadily over the years, peaking at 13.6% in 2008-09 (see table). Earlier projections made by the port indicate an annual capacity handling target of 10 crore (100 million) tonnes per annum by 2012.

Climate
Kandla has a semi-desert climate (BSh/BWh) under the Koppen-Geiger classification of climates. The average annual temperature is 24.8 °C. The average rainfall is 410 mm, most of which occurs during the monsoon from June to September.

Economy
The Port of Kandla Special Economic Zone (KASEZ) was the first special economic zone to be established in India and in Asia. Established in 1965, the Port of Kandla SEZ is the biggest multiple-product SEZ in the country.  Kandla is the first Export Processing Zone in India. Covering over 310 hectares, the special economic zone is just nine kilometers from the Port of Kandla. Today, the Port of Kandla is India's hub for exporting grains and importing oil and one of the highest-earning ports in the country. Major imports entering the Port of Kandla are petroleum, chemicals, and iron and steel and iron machinery, but it also handles salt, textiles, and grain. A town has grown up on the port with a school and hotel etc.

Expansion 
The port will soon begin selecting developers for four clean cargo berths that together aim to handle 8 million tonnes of cargo. The four berths will be supported by a 14 m draft capable of handling 75,000 dwt vessels. The port has already received encouraging response from prospective bidders, for the project that is estimated to cost nearly ₹500 crore.

KPT is also moving towards building dedicated container handling capacity. There is currently one container terminal that is under private operation by J M BAXY group . The port trust's plans include setting up a dedicated container terminal with two berths (No.11 and No.12 of the port) on BOT basis. The ₹330 crore project is expected to annually handle 6 lakh containers.

The clean cargo and container berths form only a small part of KPT's expansion plans through private enterprise. Other aspects include berthing facilities off Tekra (Tuna) that is expected to boost cargo by 1.2 crore (12 million) tonnes, an offshore liquid terminal, bunkering facilities and a ship repair and building yard.

References

External links
 Deendayal Port Trust Official Website
 Kandla Special Economic Zone, Website of Ministry of Commerce & Industry, Department of Commerce
 Official website of Kandla Special Economic Zone

Port cities in India
Cities and towns in Kutch district
Ports and harbours of Gujarat